Henrika Gustytė (born 1 September 1989) is a Lithuanian former footballer who played as a midfielder. She has been a member of the Lithuania women's national team.

References

1989 births
Living people
Women's association football midfielders
Lithuanian women's footballers
Lithuania women's international footballers